William F. Devin (March 28, 1898 – February 2, 1982) was an American politician who served as the Mayor of Seattle from 1942 to 1952.

References

1898 births
1982 deaths
Mayors of Seattle
Washington (state) Republicans